The Legend of the Blue Sea is a 2016–2017 South Korean television series starring Jun Ji-hyun and Lee Min-ho. Inspired by a classic Joseon legend from Korea's first collection of unofficial historical tales about a fisherman who captures and releases a mermaid, this drama tells the love story of a con-artist and a mermaid who travels across the ocean to find him.

The series aired on SBS from November 16, 2016, to January 25, 2017, every Wednesday and Thursday at 22:00 (KST). The series achieved a peak audience ratings of 21.0%.

Synopsis
The series centres on the love story of Shim Cheong (Jun Ji-hyun), a mermaid, and Heo Joon-jae (Lee Min-ho), a witty con-artist. Focusing on rebirth, fate, and unrequited love, their tale is juxtaposed with the parallel story of their Joseon-era incarnations, the mermaid, Se-hwa, and town head, Kim Dam-ryeong.

Dam-ryeong and Se-hwa
During the Joseon era, a mermaid saves the son of a nobleman, Kim Dam-ryeong, from drowning. Following the incident, the two children become close friends, and Dam-ryeong names her Se-hwa, meaning 'a bright, shining child', after his deceased younger sister. Despite being from two different worlds, they fall in love until Dam-ryeong is forced to take up an arranged marriage. Se-hwa plans to live upon the land with Dam-ryeong, but she cannot turn her fishtail into a pair of human legs yet due to having not reached adulthood. Devastated by the news of Dam-ryeong's marriage, she decides to leave him forever. Nevertheless, Dam-ryeong's love for Se-hwa forces him to leave his wife on their wedding night and jump into the ocean to look for her. A distraught Se-hwa rescues him from drowning and promptly erases his memories of her and their love so that he may not look for her again.

After years of separation, their paths cross again when they are adults as Se-hwa is found by town folks trapped in a cave after a storm, and brought before Dam-ryeong, now a widowed town official. While Dam-ryeong does not remember Se-hwa, he takes pity on her and sets her free. This angers the town inn head, nobleman Yang Seung-gil, who had plans of exploiting Se-hwa for his monetary desires. Yang plots to overthrow Dam-ryeong, with the help of his materialistic concubine, Hong Nan, as he murders those in his way and spreads a rumour that Dam-ryeong is unfit to rule as he is bewitched by a wicked mermaid, allowing him to capture Se-hwa as the village falls into panic. Dam-ryeong rescues Se-hwa, tortured by Yang and his concubine to extract her tears, which turn into rare sea pearls. Yang and his concubine are arrested, while Dam-ryeong returns Se-hwa to the sea so that she can recuperate.

Dam-ryeong, who has been experiencing dreams of himself, Se-hwa, and their foes in the future, fear that the same ill-fate that afflicts himself and Se-hwa will replay itself. To warn his future self, he commissions a time capsule containing a portrait of himself with a message to his future self that “everything is repeating itself” and he has to protect the reincarnation of Se-hwa from danger, mainly due to the reincarnations of Yang and anyone related to him.

A furious Dam-ryeong is determined to kill Yang and expose all his crimes until he is exiled and removed from his position by the court due to the rumours. While Dam-ryeong is being escorted on a boat for his exile, Yang and his associates renew their search for Se-hwa by setting a trap using lanterns, and she is lured up to the surface, thinking it is Dam-ryeong's signal. Se-hwa comes under attack by nets, arrows, and harpoons from Yang's men. Urged by his suspicions after noticing the floating lanterns from afar, Dam-ryeong requests for the boat to turn around, and a fight ensues between the guards and Yang's men. Dam-ryeong plunges into the water just as a harpoon, hurled by Yang's son, impales him from behind, saving Se-hwa. As Dam-ryeong dies in her arms, Se-hwa thrusts the harpoon deeper through his body and stabs herself. The boats sink, carrying Dam-ryeong's belongings with them, and Dam-ryeong's jadeite bracelet, which he gifted Se-hwa earlier, slides off from Se-hwa's hand as she dies and is lost to the ocean.

Yang and his concubine are executed for their crimes after the surviving officials clear Dam-ryeong of the false accusations. It turns out that Yang had extorted and poisoned a merchant; the merchant's son Park Moo avenges his father.

Joon-jae and Shim Cheong
In the modern-day, young Heo Joon-jae runs away from home after his parents' divorce and his father obtaining the rights to raise him. His father, Heo Il-joong (Choi Jung-woo), adopts stepson Chi-hyun (Lee Ji-hoon) after his marriage with Kang Seo-hee (Hwang Shin-hye). Joon-jae's mother, Mo Yoo-ran (Na Young-hee), after the divorce, works as a housekeeper after running out of money following the divorce. During his search for his mother, Joon-jae becomes a con-artist, using his good looks, wits, and skills in hypnotism in conducting scams with his mentor, Jo Nam-doo (Lee Hee-joon), and computer hacking genius, Tae-oh (Shin Won-ho). His affections are chased after by his college classmate, Cha Shi-ah (Shin Hye-sun).

Using the money earned from his scams, Joon-jae flies to Spain for a vacation. There he meets a mysterious woman with an unusual demeanour who breaks into his hotel room. He calls the police, who take her as a suspect for recent thefts in the local area, but Joon-jae retrieves her after being curious about the jadeite bracelet he saw on the woman's arm. Nam-doo receives a photo of the woman with the jadeite from Joon-jae and confirms over the phone that the jadeite is genuine and of unimaginably high price due to its quality. Meanwhile, Joon-jae is chased by gunmen hired by a rich businesswoman who had fallen for Joon-jae's scams. He brings the mysterious woman with him throughout the pursuit until they end up cornered on a cliff facing the sea. They jump into the water, and the woman revealed to be a mermaid unbeknownst to Joon-jae, kisses him to erase his memories of her but promises to follow him to Seoul.

Joon-jae returns to Seoul and is tormented by the gaps in his memories and Jo Nam-doo's claims of him being with a girl with expensive jadeite. After three months of travelling, the mermaid also arrives in Seoul, wandering around the city for days until she runs into Joon-jae. He recognises her to be the woman Nam-doo refers to from the pictures he sent to Nam-doo and interrogates her on her identity and why he cannot remember her, although she hesitates to answer. He brings her to his home and names her Shim Cheong. He allows her to stay at his home for several days to recollect and sort out his memories of her but makes her leave as she is reluctant to help him remember anything significant. That evening, she accidentally gets hit by Chi-hyun's car, after which Joon-jae decides to take her back to his house. After this, they steadily grow close to each other.

Linked by dreams, mysterious artefacts, including the jadeite bracelet, a vase with an image of a mermaid kissing a man in modern-day clothes, and the portrait of Kim Dam-ryeong with the inscription “everything is repeating itself", Joon-jae learns of Dam-ryeong's world and his fate, concluding that he and Shim Cheong are reincarnations of Kim Dam-ryeong and Se-hwa. Through his consultations with Professor of Neuropsychiatry Jin Kyung-won (Lee Ho-jae), he can retrieve his lost memories and the entire rendering of his dreams about Kim Dam-ryeong and Se-hwa. He can also hear Shim Cheong's inner voice; he learns that she is indeed a mermaid and that, unless she returns to the ocean, her heart will harden and eventually stop if he will not love her.

Kang Seo-hee, Joon-jae's step-mother, hires the fugitive, Ma Dae-young (Sung Dong-il), to kill Joon-jae as a part of her scheme to inherit Heo Il-joong's fortune. She also has secretly introduced Heo Il-joong with small yet potent doses of anticholinergic and monkshood extract, contributing to his failing health, particularly his vision. Chi-hyun dutifully nurses him, completely unaware of his mother's betrayal. Ma Dae-young attempts several times to murder both Joon-jae and Shim Cheong but fails. During an attempt to murder her, Ma Dae-young is surprised by Shim Cheong, after which she erases Ma Dae-young's memories and, in the process, she also learns the fate of their Joseon era incarnations Kim Dam-ryeong and Se-hwa.

Joon-jae and Shim Cheong live comfortably with each other despite conflicts and the fear of the impending ill-fate. Thanks to Shim Cheong, Joon-jae also reunites with his mother, Mo Yoo-ran, who quit her job as a housekeeper. On the other hand, Chi-hyun learns that his birth father is Ma Dae-young, Kang Seo-hee's longtime partner. He also learns of Kang Seo-hee's crimes and reluctantly consents to them. Kang Seo-hee finally kills Heo Il-joong, using a solid dose of monkshood as she becomes aware of Heo Il-joong's suspicions. Joon-jae, with the help of Shim Cheong, Jo Nam-doo, Tae-oh, and police officer-detective Hong Dong-pyo (Park Hae-soo), busts Kang Seo-hee, revealing her real name to be "Kang Ji-yeon" and her schemes. A maddened Chi-hyun grabs a police officer's gun as he's being arrested and shoots at Joon-jae, but Shim Cheong takes the shot to save him. Kang Seo-hee and Chi-hyun are both arrested, and while in custody, Chi-hyun commits suicide by monkshood poison. Shim Cheong, being a mermaid, survives the fatal injury and makes a miraculous recovery that astonishes hospital staff.

Joon-jae learns that Ma Dae-young is visiting Professor Jin Kyung-won. As Joon-jae, Jo Nam-doo, and Officer Hong Dong-pyo rush to get him, Ma Dae-young recovers his memories of his past life again and learns that the executions of his incarnation, Yang Seung-gil, and his concubine, Hong Nan, was carried out by the Park Moo, Jo Nam-doo's incarnation. Just as Professor Jin Kyung-won was about to be murdered, Joon-jae arrives with the police who arrest Ma Dae-young.

Shim Cheong is discharged from the hospital afterwards. However, she is still in recurring pain since she was shot at her heart. After noticing Cheong's discomfort several times in the absence of a complete recovery, Joon-jae decides to let go of Cheong so that she can go back into the ocean to regain her health. Before leaving, Shim Cheong erases Joon-jae's memories of her as the uncertainty of her return is enormous, even after he disagrees with the idea, and later, of everyone who knew her, except that of her friend, Yoo-na (Shin Min-ah), an elementary school student who is the reincarnation of a daughter of a mermaid and human fisherman.

Three years later, Joon-jae becomes a prosecutor, Jo Nam-doo works as a lecturer, and Tae-oh, now working as a white hacker, is engaged to Cha Shi-ah. Shim Cheong fully recovers and returns to Seoul to meet Joon-jae. Despite his lost memories, Joon-jae recognises Shim Cheong, and it is revealed that he recorded his life with Shim Cheong, in case his memories are lost again. They move to a house near the sea, and Shim Cheong becomes pregnant. Joon-jae ultimately evades the ill fate that had been in store for them with Kim Dam-ryeong's visions.

Cast

Main
Jun Ji-hyun as Shim Cheong / Se-hwa
Kal So-won as child Se-hwa
Shin Eun-soo as teenage Se-hwa 
 A mermaid in the Joseon era who falls in love with Dam-ryeong as a child after saving him, and is named as Se-hwa by Dam-ryeong after his late sister. As they are initially unable to stay together due to his arranged marriage and Se-hwa's inability to turn her tail into legs without reaching adulthood yet, she erases his memories. The two meet again and suffer a tragic fate together, beginning the first omen that will tie their reincarnations.

 In the modern day, she follows Joon-jae to Seoul after developing feelings for him in Spain. He names her Shim Cheong, which means "extremely stupid" (where Shim means "extreme" and Cheong is shortened from the Korean word for "stupid"), as she is highly ignorant about the common things on land. Coincidentally, it is also the name of a folklore character. Like her Joseon-era incarnation, she has super strength and the ability to read and erase one's memories.
Lee Min-ho as Heo Joon-jae / Kim Dam-ryeong
 as child Heo Joon-jae / Kim Dam-ryeong
Park Jin-young as teenage Heo Joon-jae / Kim Dam-ryeong
 The town head and son of a magistrate in the Joseon era who falls in love with a mermaid as a child, and names her Se-hwa after his late sister. As he begins to dream about the tragic fate of their modern-day reincarnations, he commissions a time capsule to warn his future self.

 Joon-jae, his future self, is a con-artist who uses wits and looks to conduct scams on people of the privileged class of the society. He meets Shim Cheong, a mermaid and ultimately falls in love with her, thus being able to read her thoughts. After conceiving dreams about their Joseon-era incarnations and receiving Dam-ryeong's time capsule, he sets out to change the ill-fate that chased Dam-ryeong and Se-hwa.

Supporting
Lee Hee-joon as Jo Nam-doo / Park Moo 
A con-artist and Joon-jae's mentor. He trains Joon-jae and turns him into a skilled con-artist. His Joseon incarnation is Park Moo, who worked with Yang's son. It is later revealed that his loyalty towards Dam-ryeong and Joon-jae prevails throughout, in both the Joseon era and modern day.
Shin Hye-sun as Cha Shi-ah 
Joon-jae's university junior who works as a researcher in conservational science, and has feelings for him. Through her job, she discovers Dam-ryeong's time capsule from the Joseon era and helps Joon-jae learn about Dam-ryeong. She is later revealed to be the deceased wife of Dam-ryeong in the Joseon era. She later develop a crush on Tae-oh.
Shin Won-ho as Tae-oh 
A genius hacker and a con-artist working with Joon-jae and Nam-doo. He was mentioned to be coming from Japan. He is a quiet person who likes to play computer games. He initially has a secret crush on Shim Cheong, but ends up falling for Cha Shi-ah.
Lee Ji-hoon as Heo Chi-hyun
Joon-jae's stepbrother. He tries to be a dutiful son as he stays by his stepfather's side after Joon-jae left home but turns against Joon-jae and his stepfather eventually due to his unrequited love for his stepfather. His Joseon incarnation was Yang's son, who kills Dam-ryeong and Se-hwa by impaling them with a harpoon. 
Na Young-hee as Mo Yoo-ran
Shim Yi-young as young Mo Yoo-ran
Joon-jae's mother. She works as the Cha family's housekeeper.
Hwang Shin-hye as Kang Seo-hee / Kang Ji-yeon 
Oh Yeon-ah as young Kang Seo-hee / young Kang Ji-yeon / Hong Nan
Chi-hyun's mother and Joon-jae's stepmother. She and her twin sister used to live in an orphanage before they got adopted into different families; however, her adoptive father was abusive towards her while her twin lives with a rich family. She does anything to provide a luxurious life for her son. She dispatches Ma Dae-young to kill Joon-jae to make Chi-hyun the definite heir of Heo Il-joong's fortunes. Her real name, Kang Ji-yeon, is revealed in the later part of the series when the police discover that she inherited fortunes of her two former husbands following their mysterious deaths. She later murdered her twin sister, whose name is Kang Seo-hee, and assumes her identity and wealth. She was also revealed to have grown up in the same orphanage as Ma Dae-young, who was her partner and Chi-hyun's father. In the Joseon era, she is Hong Nan, Mr. Yang's concubine.
Sung Dong-il as Ma Dae-young / Yang Seung-gil 
A corrupt nobleman during the Joseon era who attempts to capture the mermaid. In the modern day, he is a murderer and fugitive who is dispatched by Ji-hyun to kill Joon-jae. He is later revealed to be Chi-hyun's father. Ji-hyun and Dae-young are partners since childhood.
Choi Jung-woo as Heo Il-joong 
Joon-jae's father, and a property agent. After the success of his business, he divorces Yoo-ran and marries Ji-hyun.
Moon So-ri as Ahn Jin-joo
Shi-ah's sister-in-law, a Daechi-dong madam who is vain and haughty. In her past life, she is revealed to be Yoo-ran's servant.

Recurring
Park Hae-soo as Hong Dong-pyo
A modern-day detective who is investigating Dae-young's crimes as well as Joon-jae's scams. Later, he sides with Joon-jae in investigating the death of Heo Il-joong by the hands of Ji-hyun. In Joseon era, he is a government official who is indebted to Dam-ryeong after the latter clears the former's father's name of false accusations 
Park Ji-il as Manager Nam
Choi Kwon as young Manager Nam
Il-joong's secretary and Joon-jae's friend in the present time. He takes care of young Joon-jae when he's lonely after his parents' divorce. In Joseon era, he is Dam-ryeong's loyal friend.
Shin Rin-ah as Seo Yoo-na
Shim Cheong's young friend. Apart from Dam-ryeong / Joon-jae, she is the only one who can hear Se-hwa / Shim Cheong's inner voice during both the Joseon era and modern day. In the Joseon era, she was a daughter of a fisherman and a mermaid.
Hong Jin-kyung as Shim Cheong's homeless friend 
A beggar whom Shim Cheong always seeks when she has problems and needs life advice.
 as Cha Dong-shik
Shi-ah's brother and Jin-joo's husband.
Lee Ho-jae as Professor Jin Kyung-won
A modern-day neuropsychiatrist who is also Joon-jae's professor in KAIST. He helps both Heo Joon-jae and Ma Dae-young recover the memories of their Joseon-era incarnations.

Special appearances
Kim Sung-ryung as Jang Jin-ok, CEO of Myeongdong Capital (Ep. 1-3)
Ko Kyu-pil as Lead Bodyguard of Myeongdong Capital (Ep. 1,3)
Krystal Jung as Min-ji, a flight attendant (Ep. 1) 
Ahn Jae-hong as Thomas, a missionary (Ep. 2)
Kim Hye-yoon as Jang Jin-ok's daughter (Ep. 3)
Cha Tae-hyun as a Han River con-man (Ep. 4) 
 as a police officer (Ep. 5)
Park Jin-joo as a nurse (Ep. 6)
Jo Jung-suk as Yoo Jung-hoon (Ep. 7-8)
A merman working for the Han River coast guard. Initially shocked to encounter another of his kind in Seoul, he mentors Shim Cheong about survival on land. Jung-hoon loves a woman named Kim Hye-jin, but she left him after she discovered that he is a merman; as a result of Hye-jin stopped loving him, Jung-hoon dies after his heart stops beating.
 Jeong Yoo-mi as Kim Hye-jin (Ep. 8)
 A woman whom Jung-hoon loves, but she left him after discovering that he is a merman. She seems saddened and full of remorse upon receiving news of Jung-hoon's death.
Kim Sun-young as a lady in the sauna (Ep. 11)
Im Won-hee as a doctor (Ep. 19)
Kim Seul-gi as a young mermaid that Shim Cheong gives advice to (Ep. 20)

Production
Filming began on August 19, 2016 in Goesan, North Chungcheong Province, South Korea. The production team then flew to Palau to film underwater scenes. The cast and crew flew to Spain on September 11 where they filmed in A Coruña, Ribadeo, Lugo, Tossa de Mar and Castell de Santa Florentina in Canet de Mar, as well as Begur (Es Cau Swimming Pool), Sitges (Town Hall and other backdrops) and Barcelona (exteriors of Palau de la Música Catalana, etc.), among other places in Catalonia and Galicia (Spain). The first script reading was held on October 8, 2016, two months after production began, due to the busy schedules of the actors. It lasted three hours and covered the first four episodes.

This drama served as a reunion for Lee Min-ho and Kim Sung-ryung, who had son and mother relationship in the 2013 SBS hit drama across Asia, The Heirs, for Lee Ji-hoon and for Shin Hye-sun who debuted together in the 2012 KBS2 hit school drama School 2013 as well as Jun Ji-hyun, Hong Jin-kyung, and Na Young-hee who previously worked together in the 2013 SBS hit drama My Love from the Star.

Original soundtrack

Part 1

Part 2

Part 3

Part 4

Part 5

Part 6

Part 7

Part 8

Part 9

Part 10

Part 11

Instrumental
I.

II.

Charted songs

Reception
The show started with a strong 16.4% viewership rating nationwide, reaching as high as 20.7 percent for certain scenes, according to Nielsen Korea and surpassed the 20% mark in the metropolitan area by its sixth episode. The series maintained the first-place ranking for its timeslot during its airing and surpassed 20% viewership ratings. The series also fared well overseas, having been exported to all major regions around the world, including Southeast Asia, the Americas and Europe. After the release of director's cut for the first two episodes which included additional scenes, it was acclaimed to be good and many felt that these episodes would've done much better than the previous cuts.

Jun's performance as a mermaid was met with overall high praise; with The Straits Times saying that she is "brilliant as the otherworldly goofball who is blissfully unaware of the mission to save her self-worth" and Yonhap News Agency highlighting her "trademark lanky, slender yet at times powerful and dramatic performance".

Ratings
In this table,  represent the lowest ratings and  represent the highest ratings.

Awards and nominations

References

External links
  
 The Legend of the Blue Sea at Culture Depot 
 The Legend of the Blue Sea at Studio Dragon 
 
 
 

Seoul Broadcasting System television dramas
2016 South Korean television series debuts
2017 South Korean television series endings
Television series by Studio Dragon
Television series by Culture Depot
Mermaids in television
South Korean romantic fantasy television series
South Korean romantic comedy television series
Television shows set in Palau
Television shows set in Catalonia
Television series set in the Joseon dynasty
Television shows written by Park Ji-eun